The 1990 North Carolina A&T Aggies football team represented North Carolina A&T State University as a member of the Mid-Eastern Athletic Conference (MEAC) during the 1990 NCAA Division I-AA football season. Led by second-year head coach Bill Hayes, the Aggies compiled an overall record of 9–2 with a mark of 6–1 in conference play, placing second in the MEAC. North Carolina A&T played home games at Aggie Stadium in Greensboro, North Carolina.

Previous season
They finished the season 5–6 overall and 2–4 in MEAC play to finish in sixth place, losing conference games against: Morgan state, FAMU, Delaware State and South Carolina State.

Schedule

References

North Carolina AandT
North Carolina A&T Aggies football seasons
Black college football national champions
North Carolina AandT Aggies football